Montrose Park is a populated place and unincorporated community in Susquehanna Township, Dauphin County, Pennsylvania, United States, located in the Harrisburg-Carlisle Metropolitan Statistical Area.

It is roughly bounded by Front Street to the west; Montrose Street to the north, Sixth Street to the east and the Harrisburg city line to the south.

History

The neighborhood was started when local contractors built homes for their workers. In the 1950s, the Jewish Community Center relocated there from the current Harrisburg Midtown Arts Center building in Midtown Harrisburg, and the neighborhood attracted a large Jewish following.

External links 
Montrose Park Profile

References

Harrisburg–Carlisle metropolitan statistical area
Unincorporated communities in Dauphin County, Pennsylvania
Unincorporated communities in Pennsylvania